Randy Lee Velarde (born November 24, 1962) is an American former baseball infielder and utility player who played 16 seasons in Major League Baseball (MLB).  He played the majority of his career for the New York Yankees, and also played for the California/Anaheim Angels, Oakland Athletics and Texas Rangers from 1987 to 2002.  Although he primarily played as a utility infielder, Velarde was utilized in the outfield as well.

Velarde played college baseball at the Church of Christ-affiliated Lubbock Christian University in Lubbock, Texas from 1982 until 1985, when he was drafted by the Chicago White Sox.  He was subsequently traded to the New York Yankees, where he spent the majority of his career.  Velarde is best known for turning the eleventh unassisted triple play in Major League Baseball history on May 29, 2000.

Early life
Velarde was born in Midland, Texas, on November 24, 1962, and is of Mexican American descent.  He attended college at Lubbock Christian University, where he played four seasons of baseball.  However, he was not drafted by any Major League team until his senior year.

Professional career

Draft and minor leagues
Velarde was selected in the 19th round of the  amateur draft by the Chicago White Sox. He joined the New York Yankees in 1987, when the White Sox traded him with Pete Filson in exchange for Scott Nielsen and Mike Soper.

New York Yankees (1987–1995)
Becoming the most shuffled player on the Yankee roster appeared to have a negative effect on Velarde's offense, as he batted .210 in 95 games. In , he established himself as the everyday shortstop for the organization. However, he was always considered a utility player and subsequently reverted to the role, his versatility being cited as his main asset in contrast to his unreliable defense and lack of slugging prowess.

In 1993, Velarde started games at shortstop, third base, left field and center field and in the following season, he became the second-longest tenured Yankee player behind team captain Don Mattingly.  He became a free agent at the end of the season for the first time in his career and re-signed with the Yankees for a one-year, $350,000 contract plus incentives, even though he was given a higher offer by other teams.  Velarde's willingness to play in any position and his loyalty to the team prompted his manager, Buck Showalter, to call him "the epitome of a team player."  In , his final season with the Yankees, Velarde spent most of his time playing second base and though his batting average during the regular season was .278, he batted a disappointing .176 during the postseason.  He again became a free agent at the end of the season.

Remainder of career (1996–2002)
Though Velarde was keen to remain with the Yankees (the only team he had played for up to this point), they turned down his request for a three-year contract. He reluctantly departed and signed a three-year, $2.45 million contract with the California Angels. After more than three seasons with the Angels, Velarde was traded to the Oakland Athletics in the middle of the  season. That year, he finished fourth in the American League in hits (200) and second in assists (493), while his season totals in batting average (.317), runs (105), hits, triples (7), home runs (16), runs batted in (76), stolen bases (24) and on-base percentage (.390) are all personal bests.

In his second season with the Athletics, Velarde turned an unassisted triple play against the Yankees, his former team, on May 29 in the bottom of the 6th inning. Velarde caught a line drive off of the bat of Shane Spencer, tagged Jorge Posada coming from first base, and touched second base to put out Tino Martinez.  It was the eleventh time that such a play had been executed and Velarde became only the third second baseman to accomplish the feat  Velarde rejoined the Yankees in the middle of the  season after a short stint with the Texas Rangers.  He acknowledged that he had made a mistake when he departed the Yankees in 1995 in order to become an everyday player and vowed to "redeem the part of the career [he] missed."  He ended up appearing in the 2001 World Series, where the Yankees lost to the Arizona Diamondbacks in seven games.  Though he played the majority of his career with the Yankees, Velarde never won a World Series ring with the team.  This was partially due to bad timing; the Yankees won the World Series the year after Velarde left and lost the World Series the season he returned, while winning four championships while he was away.

Velarde rejoined the Oakland Athletics for the  season before retiring.

Career statistics
In 1,273 games over 16 seasons, Velarde posted a .276 batting average (1171-for-4244) with 633 runs, 214 doubles, 23 triples, 100 home runs, 445 RBI, 78 stolen bases, 463 bases on balls, .352 on-base percentage and .408 slugging percentage. He finished his career with a .970 fielding percentage playing primarily at second and third base and shortstop. He also has played at first base and all three outfield positions. In 18 postseason games, he hit .235 (12-for-51) with 6 runs, 2 doubles, 5 RBI, and 9 walks.

Use of performance-enhancing drugs
Velarde was one of several players named in the Mitchell Report, which was released on December 13, 2007. Velarde said that he used the drugs while a member of the Oakland A's.  Through his lawyer, he admitted that he had used "the cream" and "the clear," both of which were supplied to him by Greg Anderson.  Velarde later testified in the Barry Bonds perjury case, stating that he purchased performance-enhancing drugs from and was injected with human growth hormone by Anderson, who was Bonds' personal trainer.

See also

List of Major League Baseball players named in the Mitchell Report

References
FootnotesBibliography

External links

1962 births
Living people
Albany-Colonie Yankees players
American baseball players of Mexican descent
American expatriate baseball players in Canada
Anaheim Angels players
Baseball players from Texas
California Angels players
Columbus Clippers players
Lubbock Christian Chaparrals baseball players
Major League Baseball infielders
Major League Baseball outfielders
New York Yankees players
Lake Elsinore Storm players
Oakland Athletics players
People from Midland, Texas
Robert E. Lee High School (Midland, Texas) alumni
Sacramento River Cats players
Texas Rangers players
Tulsa Drillers players
Vancouver Canadians players